The Illinois Miss Basketball honor recognizes the top high school basketball player in the state of Illinois.

Award winners

See also
Mr. Illinois Basketball

References

Illinois
High school sports in Illinois
Women's sports in Illinois
Lists of people from Illinois
American women's basketball players
Basketball players from Illinois
Lists of American sportswomen
Miss Basketball